Acavus is a genus of air-breathing land snails, terrestrial pulmonate gastropod mollusks in the family Acavidae.

They belongs to group of tree snails that inhabited the ancient continent of Gondwana over 150 million years ago.

These beautiful tree snails are endemic to Sri Lanka. It is present a large intraspecific polymorphism, with the development of various geographical subspecies (among them Acavus phoenix phoenix and Acavus phoenix castaneus).

Species
 Acavus haemastoma  (Linnaeus, 1758)
 Acavus phoenix  Pfeiffer, 1854
 Acavus superbus  Pfeiffer, 1850

References
 B. Hausdorfi and Kalika K. Pereira  -  REVISION OF THE GENUS ACAVUS FROM SRI LANKA (GASTROPODA: ACAVIDAE) 
Natural History Museum

External links
 Conchology
 WMSBD

Acavidae
Gastropod genera